Social anthropology is the study of patterns of behaviour in human societies and cultures. It is the dominant constituent of anthropology throughout the United Kingdom and much of Europe, where it is distinguished from cultural anthropology. In the United States, social anthropology is commonly subsumed within cultural anthropology or sociocultural anthropology.

Comparison with cultural anthropology

The term cultural anthropology is generally applied to ethnographic works that are holistic in spirit, are oriented to the ways in which culture affects individual experience, or aim to provide a rounded view of the knowledge, customs, and institutions of a people. Social anthropology is a term applied to ethnographic works that attempt to isolate a particular system of social relations such as those that comprise domestic life, economy, law, politics, or religion, give analytical priority to the organizational bases of social life, and attend to cultural phenomena as somewhat secondary to the main issues of social scientific inquiry.

Topics of interest for social anthropologists have included customs, economic and political organization, law and conflict resolution, patterns of consumption and exchange, kinship and family structure, gender relations, childbearing and socialization, religion, while present-day social anthropologists are also concerned with issues of globalism, ethnic violence, gender studies, transnationalism and local experience, and the emerging cultures of cyberspace, and can also help with bringing opponents together when environmental concerns come into conflict with economic developments. 
British and American anthropologists including Gillian Tett and Karen Ho who studied Wall Street provided an alternative explanation for the financial crisis of 2007–2010 to the technical explanations rooted in economic and political theory.

Differences among British, French, and American sociocultural anthropologies have diminished with increasing dialogue and borrowing of both theory and methods. Social and cultural anthropologists, and some who integrate the two, are found in most institutes of anthropology. Thus the formal names of institutional units no longer necessarily reflect fully the content of the disciplines these cover. Some, such as the Institute of Social and Cultural Anthropology (Oxford) changed their name to reflect the change in composition, others, such as Social Anthropology at the University of Kent  became simply Anthropology. Most retain the name under which they were founded.

Long-term qualitative research, including intensive field studies (emphasizing participant observation methods), has been traditionally encouraged in social anthropology rather than quantitative analysis of surveys, questionnaires and brief field visits typically used by economists, political scientists, and (most) sociologists.

Focus and practice 

Social anthropology is distinguished from subjects such as economics or political science by its holistic range and the attention it gives to the comparative diversity of societies and cultures across the world, and the capacity this gives the discipline to re-examine Euro-American assumptions. It is differentiated from sociology, both in its main methods (based on long-term participant observation and linguistic competence), and in its commitment to the relevance and illumination provided by micro studies.  It extends beyond strictly social phenomena to culture, art, individuality, and cognition. Many social anthropologists use quantitative methods, too, particularly those whose research touches on topics such as local economies, demography, human ecology, cognition, or health and illness.

Specializations

Specializations within social anthropology shift as its objects of study are transformed and as new intellectual paradigms appear; musicology and medical anthropology are examples of current, well-defined specialities.

More recent and currently cognitive development; social and ethical understandings of novel technologies; emergent forms of "the family" and other new socialities modelled on kinship; the ongoing social fall-out of the demise of state socialism; the politics of resurgent religiosity; and analysis of audit cultures and accountability.

The subject has been enlivened by, and has contributed to, approaches from other disciplines, such as philosophy (ethics, phenomenology, logic), the history of science, psychoanalysis, and linguistics.

Ethical considerations
The subject has both ethical and reflexive dimensions. Practitioners have developed an awareness of the sense in which scholars create their objects of study and the ways in which anthropologists themselves may contribute to processes of change in the societies they study.  An example of this is the "hawthorne effect", whereby those being studied may alter their behaviour in response to the knowledge that they are being watched and studied.

History

Social anthropology has historical roots in a number of 19th-century disciplines, including the study of Classics, ethnography, ethnology, folklore, linguistics, and sociology, among others. Its immediate precursor took shape in the work of Edward Burnett Tylor and James George Frazer in the late 19th century and underwent major changes in both method and theory during the period 1890–1920 with a new emphasis on original fieldwork, long-term holistic study of social behavior in natural settings, and the introduction of French and German social theory.

Polish anthropologist and ethnographer Bronisław Malinowski, one of the most important influences on British social anthropology, emphasized long-term fieldwork in which anthropologists work in the vernacular and immerse themselves in the daily practices of local people. This development was bolstered by Franz Boas' introduction of the concept of cultural relativism, arguing that cultures are based on different ideas about the world and can therefore only be properly understood in terms of their own standards and values.

Museums such as the British Museum weren't the only site of anthropological studies; with the New Imperialism period, starting in the 1870s, zoos became unattended "laboratories", especially the so-called "ethnological exhibitions" or "Negro villages". Thus, "savages" from the Americas, Africa and Asia were displayed, often nude, in cages, in what has been termed "human zoos". In 1906, Congolese pygmy Ota Benga was put by American anthropologist Madison Grant in a cage in the Bronx Zoo, labelled "the missing link" between an orangutan and the "White race"—Grant, a renowned eugenicist, was also the author of The Passing of the Great Race (1916). Such exhibitions were attempts to illustrate and prove in the same movement the validity of scientific racism, whose first formulation may be found in Arthur de Gobineau's An Essay on the Inequality of Human Races (1853–1855). In 1931, the Colonial Exhibition in Paris still displayed Kanaks from New Caledonia in the "indigenous village"; it received 24 million visitors in six months, thus demonstrating the popularity of such "human zoos".

Anthropology grew increasingly distinct from natural history and by the end of the 19th century the discipline began to crystallize into its modern form—by 1935, for example, it was possible for T. K. Penniman to write a history of the discipline entitled A Hundred Years of Anthropology. At the time, the field was dominated by "the comparative method". It was assumed that all societies passed through a single evolutionary process from the most primitive to most advanced. Non-European societies were thus seen as evolutionary "living fossils" that could be studied in order to understand the European past. Scholars wrote histories of prehistoric migrations which were sometimes valuable but often also fanciful. It was during this time that Europeans first accurately traced Polynesian migrations across the Pacific Ocean for instance—although some of them believed it originated in Egypt. Finally, the concept of race was actively discussed as a way to classify—and rank—human beings based on difference.

Tylor and Frazer

Edward Burnett Tylor (1832–1917) and James George Frazer (1854–1941) are generally considered the antecedents to modern social anthropologists in Great Britain. Although the British anthropologist Tylor undertook a field trip to Mexico, both he and Frazer derived most of the material for their comparative studies through extensive reading, not fieldwork, mainly the Classics (literature and history of Ancient Greece and Rome), the work of the early European folklorists, and reports from missionaries, travelers, and contemporaneous ethnologists.

Tylor advocated strongly for unilinealism and a form of "uniformity of mankind". Tylor in particular laid the groundwork for theories of cultural diffusionism, stating that there are three ways that different groups can have similar cultural forms or technologies: "independent invention, inheritance from ancestors in a distant region, transmission from one race  to another."

Tylor formulated one of the early and influential anthropological conceptions of culture as "that complex whole, which includes knowledge, belief, art, morals, law, custom, and any other capabilities and habits acquired by [humans] as [members] of society." However, as Stocking notes, Tylor mainly concerned himself with describing and mapping the distribution of particular elements of culture, rather than with the larger function, and he generally seemed to assume a Victorian idea of progress rather than the idea of non-directional, multilineal cultural change proposed by later anthropologists. Tylor also theorized about the origins of religious beliefs in human beings, proposing a theory of animism as the earliest stage, and noting that "religion" has many components, of which he believed the most important to be belief in supernatural beings (as opposed to moral systems, cosmology, etc.).

Frazer, a Scottish scholar with a broad knowledge of Classics, also concerned himself with the study of religion, mythology, and magic. His comparative studies, most influentially in the numerous editions of The Golden Bough, analyzed similarities in religious belief and symbolism globally. Neither Tylor nor Frazer, however, were particularly interested in fieldwork, nor were they interested in examining how the cultural elements and institutions fit together. The Golden Bough was abridged drastically in subsequent editions after his first.

Malinowski and the British School

Toward the turn of the 20th century, a number of anthropologists became dissatisfied with this categorization of cultural elements; historical reconstructions also came to seem increasingly speculative to them. Under the influence of several younger scholars, a new approach came to predominate among British anthropologists, concerned with analyzing how societies held together in the present (synchronic analysis, rather than diachronic or historical analysis), and emphasizing long-term (one to several years) immersion fieldwork. Cambridge University financed a multidisciplinary expedition to the Torres Strait Islands in 1898, organized by Alfred Cort Haddon and including a physician-anthropologist, William Rivers, as well as a linguist, a botanist, and other specialists. The findings of the expedition set new standards for ethnographic description.

A decade and a half later, the Polish anthropology student Bronisław Malinowski (1884–1942) was beginning what he expected to be a brief period of fieldwork in the old model, collecting lists of cultural items, when the outbreak of the First World War stranded him in New Guinea. As a subject of the Austro-Hungarian Empire resident on a British colonial possession, he was effectively confined to New Guinea for several years.

He made use of the time by undertaking far more intensive fieldwork than had been done by  anthropologists, and his classic ethnographical work, Argonauts of the Western Pacific (1922) advocated an approach to fieldwork that became standard in the field: getting "the native's point of view" through participant observation. Theoretically, he advocated a functionalist interpretation, which examined how social institutions functioned to satisfy individual needs.

1920s–1940

Modern social anthropology was founded in Britain at the London School of Economics and Political Science following World War I. Influences include both the methodological revolution pioneered by Bronisław Malinowski's process-oriented fieldwork in the Trobriand Islands of Melanesia between 1915 and 1918 and Alfred Radcliffe-Brown's theoretical program for systematic comparison that was based on a conception of rigorous fieldwork and the structure-functionalist conception of Durkheim’s sociology.  Other intellectual founders include W. H. R. Rivers and A. C. Haddon, whose orientation reflected the contemporary Parapsychologies of Wilhelm Wundt and Adolf Bastian, and Sir E. B. Tylor, who defined anthropology as a positivist science following Auguste Comte. Edmund Leach (1962) defined social anthropology as a kind of comparative micro-sociology based on intensive fieldwork studies.  Scholars have not settled a theoretical orthodoxy on the nature of science and society, and their tensions reflect views which are seriously opposed.

A. R. Radcliffe-Brown also published a seminal work in 1922. He had carried out his initial fieldwork in the Andaman Islands in the old style of historical reconstruction. However, after reading the work of French sociologists Émile Durkheim and Marcel Mauss, Radcliffe-Brown published an account of his research (entitled simply The Andaman Islanders) that paid close attention to the meaning and purpose of rituals and myths. Over time, he developed an approach known as structural functionalism, which focused on how institutions in societies worked to balance out or create an equilibrium in the social system to keep it functioning harmoniously. His structuralist approach contrasted with Malinowski's functionalism, and was quite different from the later French structuralism, which examined the conceptual structures in language and symbolism.

Malinowski and Radcliffe-Brown's influence stemmed from the fact that they, like Boas, actively trained students and aggressively built up institutions that furthered their programmatic ambitions. This was particularly the case with Radcliffe-Brown, who spread his agenda for "Social Anthropology" by teaching at universities across the British Empire and Commonwealth. From the late 1930s until the postwar period appeared a string of monographs and edited volumes that cemented the paradigm of British Social Anthropology (BSA). Famous ethnographies include The Nuer, by Edward Evan Evans-Pritchard, and The Dynamics of Clanship Among the Tallensi, by Meyer Fortes; well-known edited volumes include African Systems of Kinship and Marriage and African Political Systems.

Post-World War II trends 

Following World War II, sociocultural anthropology as comprised by the fields of ethnography and ethnology diverged into an American school of cultural anthropology while social anthropology diversified in Europe by challenging the principles of structure-functionalism, absorbing ideas from Claude Lévi-Strauss's structuralism and from the followers of Max Gluckman, and embracing the study of conflict, change, urban anthropology, and networks. Together with many of his colleagues at the Rhodes-Livingstone Institute and students at Manchester University, collectively known as the Manchester School, took BSA in new directions through their introduction of explicitly Marxist-informed theory, their emphasis on conflicts and conflict resolution, and their attention to the ways in which individuals negotiate and make use of the social structural possibilities. During this period Gluckman was also involved in a dispute with American anthropologist Paul Bohannan on ethnographic methodology within the anthropological study of law. He believed that indigenous terms used in ethnographic data should be translated into Anglo-American legal terms for the benefit of the reader. The Association of Social Anthropologists of the UK and Commonwealth was founded in 1946.

In Britain, anthropology had a great intellectual impact, it "contributed to the erosion of Christianity, the growth of cultural relativism, an awareness of the survival of the primitive in modern life, and the replacement of diachronic modes of analysis with synchronic, all of which are central to modern culture." Later in the 1960s and 1970s, Edmund Leach and his students Mary Douglas and Nur Yalman, among others, introduced French structuralism in the style of Claude Lévi-Strauss.

In countries of the British Commonwealth, social anthropology has often been institutionally separate from physical anthropology and primatology, which may be connected with departments of biology and zoology; and from archaeology, which may be connected with departments of Classics, Egyptology, Oriental studies, and the like. In other countries (and in some, particularly smaller, British and North American universities), anthropologists have also found themselves institutionally linked with scholars of cultural studies, ethnic studies, folklore, human geography, museum studies, sociology, social relations, and social work. British anthropology has continued to emphasize social organization and economics over purely symbolic or literary topics.

1980s to present
The European Association of Social Anthropologists (EASA) was founded in 1989 as a society of scholarship at a meeting of founder members from fourteen European countries, supported by the Wenner-Gren Foundation for Anthropological Research. The Association seeks to advance anthropology in Europe by organizing biennial conferences and by editing its academic journal, Social Anthropology/Anthropologies Social.  Departments of Social Anthropology at different universities have tended to focus on disparate aspects of the field, and can be found in several universities around the world. The field of social anthropology has expanded in ways not anticipated by the founders of the field, as for example in the subfield of structure and dynamics.

Anthropologists associated with social anthropology

 Andre Beteille
 Aleksandar Boskovic
 Edmund Snow Carpenter
 Mary Douglas
 Thomas Hylland Eriksen
 E. E. Evans-Pritchard
 Raymond Firth
 Rosemary Firth
 Meyer Fortes
 Ernest Gellner
 Stephen D. Glazier
 Jack Goody
 David Graeber
 Don Kalb
 Adam Kuper
 Edmund Leach
 Murray Leaf
 Claude Lévi-Strauss
 Alan Macfarlane
 Bronisław Malinowski
 Siegfried Frederick Nadel
 Susan Visvanathan
 A.H.J. Prins
 Alfred Radcliffe-Brown
 Audrey Richards
 Juan Mauricio Renold
 Victor Turner
 Marshall Sahlins
 Philippe Descola
 Marilyn Strathern
 Hebe Vessuri
 Douglas R. White
 Eric Wolf
 Robert Layton
 Judith MacDougall
 David MacDougall

See also
 Cultural anthropology
 Ethnology
 Ethnosemiotics
 List of important publications in anthropology
 Rajamandala
 Sociology
 Structuralism

Notes

References
 Benchmark Statement Anthropology (UK)

Further reading 
 Malinowski, Bronislaw (1915): The Trobriand Islands
 Malinowski, Bronislaw (1922): Argonauts of the Western Pacific
 Malinowski, Bronislaw (1929): The Sexual Life of Savages in North-Western Melanesia
 Malinowski, Bronislaw (1935): Coral Gardens and Their Magic: A Study of the Methods of Tilling the Soil and of Agricultural Rites in the Trobriand Islands
 Leach, Edmund (1954): Political systems of Highland Burma. London: G. Bell.
 Leach, Edmund (1982): Social Anthropology
 Eriksen, Thomas H. (1985):, pp. 926–929 in The Social Science Encyclopedia 
 Kuper, Adam (1996):

External links
  The Moving Anthropology Student Network (MASN) -  website offers tutorials, information on the subject, discussion-forums and a large link-collection for all interested scholars of social anthropology